This is a list of protests in the U.S. State of Vermont related to the murder of George Floyd.

Locations

Bellows Falls 
On June 5, about 300 people marched through the streets in support of Black Lives Matter and held a moment of silence for eight minutes and forty-six seconds to honor George Floyd.

Brattleboro 
On May 30, hundreds of protesters lined Main Street "one end to the other" with many slogans and the names of African Americans killed by the police.

Burlington 
On May 30, around 1,200 people protested in Battery Park and moved toward the Burlington Police Department.

Essex Junction 
On June 5, a group of around 300 protesters gathered at Five Corners to honor George Floyd, with some taking a knee and others lying down on their stomachs with their hands behind their backs.

Middlebury 
On May 30, roughly 375 people congregated on and around College Park and the Cross Street Bridge.

Montpelier 
On May 30, hundreds of people protested at the intersection of State and Main Streets.

Newport 
On June 7, around 100 protesters marched from the downtown police station to Gardner Memorial Park along Route 5 to protest police violence.

Rutland 
On June 7, approximately 600 people came to Main Street Park for a youth-led peaceful gathering to protest racial injustice and police brutality.

St. Albans 
On June 2, people protested at Taylor Park in St. Albans. One man was arrested.

St. Johnsbury 
On June 3, four arrests were made during a protest where more than 100 people gathered in front of the St. Johnsbury Police Station.

References 

Vermont
2020 in Vermont
Events in Vermont
Riots and civil disorder in Vermont
May 2020 events in the United States
June 2020 events in the United States